Richard Lepper (15 July 1897 – 30 March 1943) was a general in the Wehrmacht of Nazi Germany during World War II. He was a recipient of the Knight's Cross of the Iron Cross. Lepper surrendered to the Soviet troops after the fall of Stalingrad. He died in captivity on 30 March 1943.

Awards and decorations

 Knight's Cross of the Iron Cross on 17 December 1942 as Oberst and commander of Artilleriekommandeur 6

References

Citations

Bibliography

 

1897 births
1943 deaths
Major generals of the German Army (Wehrmacht)
German Army personnel of World War I
Recipients of the Knight's Cross of the Iron Cross
German prisoners of war in World War II held by the Soviet Union
German people who died in Soviet detention
People from the Province of Brandenburg
Recipients of the clasp to the Iron Cross, 1st class
Military personnel from Potsdam